Văcăreşti may refer to several entities in Romania:

Văcărescu family of boyars
Văcărești, Bucharest
Văcăreşti Monastery
Văcăreşti prison
Văcărești, Dâmbovița, a commune in Dâmboviţa County
Văcăreşti, a village in Mihăileni Commune, Harghita County
Văcăreşti, a village in Drăgănești de Vede Commune, Teleorman County

See also 
 Văcăria River (disambiguation)
 Văcarea (disambiguation)